The Battle of Bengtskär was an amphibious landing action fought between Finnish and Soviet forces on 26 July 1941 during the Continuation War.

Battle 
Soviet landing troops made a surprise attack on the island of Bengtskär with the goal to blow up the lighthouse situated on the island so that it would not disturb Soviet military operations. Finnish troops situated on the island managed to defend the lighthouse and eventually drove the Soviets back with the help of support troops.
The landing was made with four MO-class patrol boats, while another 6 boats were later dispatched to retrieve the Soviet forces once it was clear the demolition attempt had failed. Finnish gunboats Uusimaa and Hämeenmaa engaged the Soviets, with Uusimaa sinking the patrol boat PK-238 with gunfire.

Results 
The battle resulted in a Finnish victory, due to the intervention of the gunboats. 16 Soviet sailors were saved and captured from the sinking PK-238, while another 13 were captured on the Island. Some Soviet soldiers committed suicide with hand-grenades. Finnish estimates puts Soviet losses at 60 killed (40 of them on land), while Finnish suffered a loss of 16 men in the garrison and 4 men on the ships, while the next day a Soviet aerial bombing killed another 11 men waiting to be evacuated. Soviet sources report that the landing party consisted of only 31 men: casualties were 31 killed (including 8 sailors) and 24 prisoners (including 16 sailors).

References 

Battles and operations of the Continuation War
Naval battles of World War II involving Finland
Naval battles of World War II involving the Soviet Union
1941 in Finland
July 1941 events